The 1938 Indiana Hoosiers football team represented the Indiana Hoosiers in the 1938 Big Ten Conference football season. The participated as members of the Big Ten Conference. The Hoosiers played their home games at Memorial Stadium in Bloomington, Indiana. The team was coached by Bo McMillin, in his fifth year as head coach of the Hoosiers.

Schedule

1939 NFL draftees

References

Indiana
Indiana Hoosiers football seasons
Indiana Hoosiers football